Farciot Edouart, ASC (born Alexander Farciot Edouart; November 5, 1894 – March 17, 1980) was a motion picture special effects artist and innovator, a recognized specialist and innovator in the area of "process photography", also known as rear projection.

In a career beginning in 1915, Edouart won a total of ten Academy Awards:  two competitive (1942 and 1943), seven technical and scientific awards (1938, 1940, two in 1944, 1948, and two in 1956), and an honorary award for special effects (1939).

He worked on approximately 350 films, the last one being Rosemary's Baby in 1968.  Leonard Maltin wrote "The master of process-screen photography is Farciot Edouart."

Edouart was born in Northern California, the son of a portrait photographer, and began working as a cameraman while still a teenager at the production company of Hobart Bosworth. By way of mergers and acquisitions,  Edouart became an employee of Paramount Pictures where he started to specialise on optical effects in the mid-1920s. He worked for Paramount until his department was closed on short notice in 1967.

Academy Awards
 In 1939, Edouart shared a special Academy Award for Best Visual Effects, "For outstanding achievement in creating special photographic and sound effects" for Spawn of the North
 In 1940, he received a nomination for Union Pacific.
 In 1940, he received an Academy Award for Technical Achievement together with Joseph E. Robbins and William Rudolph for "the design and construction of a quiet portable treadmill".
 In 1941, he received nominations for Dr. Cyclops and Typhoon (both with Gordon Jennings).
 In 1942, he won for I Wanted Wings and was nominated for Aloma of the South Seas (both with Gordon Jennings).
 In 1943, Edouart won for Reap the Wild Wind (with Jennings and William Pereira).
 In 1944, he was nominated for So Proudly We Hail! (with Jennings).
 In 1945, he received a nomination for The Story of Dr. Wassell (with Jennings).
 In 1948, he received a nomination for Unconquered (with Devereux Jennings and Gordon Jennings).

References

External links 

Farciot Edouart at Film Reference

1894 births
1980 deaths
Academy Honorary Award recipients
Academy Award for Technical Achievement winners
Best Visual Effects Academy Award winners
Artists from Los Angeles
Special effects people